The  2017 Rising Phoenix World Championships was an IFBB Wings of Strength female professional bodybuilding competition and held in conjunction with the IFBB Arizona Pro. It was held on September 9, 2017 at the Talking Stick Resort in Scottsdale, Arizona.

Call outs

Prejudging

 Cristina Franzoso, Victoria Dominguez, Lisa Cross, Kim Buck, Nicki Chartrand, Sheila Bleck, Rita Bello, and Irene Andersen
 Pauline Nelson, Maria Mikola, Kimberly McGuire, Wendy McCready, Silvia Matta, Janeen Lankowski, Elena Hreapca, Theresa Ivancik
 Aleesha Young, Helle Trevino, Tischa Thomas, Bonnie Switzer-Pappas, Virginia Sanchez, Angela Rayburn, and Yaxeni Oriquen-Garcia
 Helle Trevino (later switches place with Wendy McCready), Wendy McCready (later switches place with Helle Trevino), Sheila Bleck, and Yaxeni Oriquen-Garcia
 Virginia Sanchez (later switches place with Irene Andersen), Irene Andersen (later switches place with Virginia Sanchez), Wendy McCready, Yaxeni Oriquen-Garcia, Aleesha Young (later switches place with Kim Buck, later switched back with Kim Buck), Kim Buck (later switches place with Aleesha Young, later switched back with Aleesha Young)
 Lisa Cross (later switches place with Irene Andersen, later switched with Aleesha Young), Irene Andersen (later switches place with Lisa Cross), Aleesha Young (later switches place with Silvia Matta, later switched back with Silvia Matta, and later switched with Lisa Cross), Rita Bello, Janeen Lankowski, and Silvia Matta (later switches place with Aleesha Young, later switched back with Aleesha Young)
 Pauline Nelson, Kimberly McGuire (later switches place with Maria Mikola), Angela Rayburn (later switches place with Elena Hreapca, later switches place with Theresa Ivancik), Maria Mikola (later switches place with Kimberly McGuire), Elena Hreapca (later switches place with Angela Rayburn), and Theresa Ivancik (later switches place with Angela Rayburn)
 Silvia Matta (later switches place with Bonnie Switzer-Pappas), Tischa Thomas, Bonnie Switzer-Pappas (later switches place with Silvia Matta), Victoria Dominguez, and Cristina Franzoso
 Helle Trevino and Sheila Bleck
 Wendy McCready (later switches place with Virginia Sanchez), Virginia Sanchez (later switches place with Wendy McCready), Yaxeni Oriquen-Garcia, and Kim Buck

Confirmation round
 Helle Trevino (later switches place with Yaxeni Oriquen-Garcia), Yaxeni Oriquen-Garcia (later switches place with Helle Trevino), Sheila Bleck, and Wendy McCready
 Lisa Cross (later switched place with Lisa Cross), Virginia Sanchez (later switches place with Rita Bello), Rita Bello (later switches place with Virginia Sanchez), Kim Buck (later switches place with Aleesha Young), and Aleesha Young (later switches place with Kim Buck, later switched place with Lisa Cross)
 Maria Mikola, Nicki Chartrand (later switches place with Irene Andersen), Janeen Lankowski, Silvia Matta (later switches place with Irene Andersen), Elena Hreapca, and Irene Andersen (later switches place with Silvia Matta, later switches place with Nicki Chartrand)
 Bonnie Switzer-Pappas, Theresa Ivancik (later switches place with Kimberly McGuire), Victoria Dominguez, Tischa Thomas, Kimberly McGuire (later switches place with Theresa Ivancik), Angela Rayburn, Pauline Nelson, Cristina Franzoso

Prize money

Overall award prize money
1st - $50,000 + $65,000 customized Jeep
2nd - $25,000
3rd - $12,500
4th - $7,500
5th - $5,000
Total: $100,000 + $65,000 customized Jeep

Best poser award prize money
1st - $6,000
2nd - $3,000
3rd - $2,000
Total: $11,000

Most muscular award prize money
1st - $7,000
Total: $7,000

Best intro video award prize money
1st - $5,000
2nd - $3,000
3rd - $2,000
Total: $10,000

Results

Overall results
1st - Helle Trevino
2nd - Sheila Bleck
3rd - Yaxeni Oriquen-Garcia
4th - Wendy McCready
5th - Virginia Sanchez
6th - Aleesha Young
7th - Kim Buck
8th - Rita Bello
9th - Lisa Cross
10th - Janeen Lankowski
11th - Silvia Matta
12th - Nicki Chartrand
13th - Irene Andersen
14th - Maria Mikola
15th - Kimberly McGuire
16th - Victoria Dominguez
16th - Cristina Franzoso
16th - Elena Hreapca
16th - Theresa Ivancik
16th - Pauline Nelson
16th - Angela Rayburn
16th - Bonnie Switzer-Pappas
16th - Tischa Thomas

Comparison to previous Rising Phoenix World Championships results:

+2 - Helle Trevino
Same - Sheila Bleck
+2 - Yaxeni Oriquen-Garcia
+7 - Virginia Sanchez
Same - Aleesha Young
-1 - Kim Buck
+2 - Rita Bello
-2 - Lisa Cross
+3- Silvia Matta
-5 - Irene Andersen
-5 - Angela Rayburn

Scorecard
* Tie broken by final round

Best poser results
1st - Sheila Bleck
2nd - Virginia Sanchez
3rd - Pauline Nelson

Most muscular winner
Winner - Aleesha Young

Comparison to previous Rising Phoenix World Championships results:

+1 - Aleesha Young
-1 - Sheila Bleck

Best intro results
1st - Silvia Matta
2nd - Nicki Chartrand
3rd - Teresa Ivancik

Attended
3rd Rising Phoenix World Championships attended - Helle Trevino, Yaxeni Oriquen-Garcia, Lisa Cross, Irene Andersen, Rita Bello, and Aleesha Young
2nd Rising Phoenix World Championships attended - Sheila Bleck, Kim Buck, Angela Rayburn, Virginia Sanchez, and Silvia Matta
1st Rising Phoenix World Championships attended - Wendy McCready, Janeen Lankowski, Maria Mikola, Kimberly McGuire, Victoria Dominguez, Cristina Franzoso, Elena Hreapca, Theresa Ivancik, Pauline Nelson, Bonnie Switzer-Pappas, and Tischa Thomas
Previous year Olympia attendees who did not attend - Margaret Martin, Isabelle Turell, Alana Shipp, Alina Popa, Nancy Clark, Jacqueline Fuchs, Lora Ottenad, Amanda Aivaliotis, and Laura Carolan

Notable events
This was Helle Trevino's 1st Ms Rising Phoenix overall award win. Both Helle Trevino and Sheila Bleck tied, with the tie being broken by final round.
This was Sheila Bleck's 2nd Ms Rising Phoenix best poser award win.
This was Aleesha Young's 1st Ms Rising Phoenix most muscular award win.
This was Silvia Matta's 1st Ms Rising Phoenix best intro award win.
The 2017 Rising Phoenix World Championships was held on Irene Andersen's birthday.
 Margie Martin, Alina Popa, and Brittney O'Veal all qualified, but did not attend. This is the first time a Ms Rising Phoenix title holder would not be defending her title.

2017 Rising Phoenix World Championships Qualified

Points standings

 In the event of a tie, the competitor with the best top five contest placings will be awarded the qualification. If both competitors have the same contest placings, than both will qualify for the Rising Phoenix World Championships.

See also
2017 Mr. Olympia

References

External links
 Wings of Strength Rising Phoenix World Championships (Pre-Judging)
 Wings of Strength Rising Phoenix World Championships (Finals)

2017 in American sports
Wings of Strength
2017 in bodybuilding
History of female bodybuilding
Female professional bodybuilding competitions